Hexachaeta leptofasciata is a species of tephritid or fruit fly in the genus Hexachaeta of the family Tephritidae.

References

leptofasciata